Black Lives Matter street mural (Seattle) may refer to:

 Black Lives Matter street mural (Capitol Hill, Seattle)
 Black Lives Matter street mural (Seattle City Hall)